The 2010 Cuyahoga County executive election took place on November 2, 2010, to elect the County Executive of Cuyahoga County, Ohio. This was the first held under the newly ratified Charter of Cuyahoga County, which replaced Cuyahoga's 200 year old Board of County Commissioners with an executive and legislature, establishing the office of County Executive.

The Democrats nominated the mayor of Lakewood Ed FitzGerald, while the Republicans nominated former Ohio State Representative Matt Dolan. This was the only Cuyahoga County executive election to date with more than two candidates on the ballot, with the Green Party nominating architect David H. Ellison, and businessmen Ken Lanci and Don Scipione as well as former Cuyahoga County Commissioner Tim McCormack running as independents. 

FitzGerald defeated Dolan by approximately 50,000 votes with 45.7% of the vote to Dolan's 30.3%, making it the closest County Executive election in Cuyahoga's history, and the only to be won by a plurality of the vote.

Democratic Primary

Candidates

Nominee
 Ed FitzGerald, mayor of Lakewood (2008-2010)

Eliminated in primary
 James F. Brown, bus driver
 Terri Hamilton Brown, executive director of the Cuyahoga Metropolitan Housing Authority (1998-2011)
 Dianna Lynn Hill

Primary results

Republican primary

Candidates

Nominee
 Matt Dolan, former Ohio State Representative from District 98 (2005-2010)

Eliminated in primary
 Paul Casey, high school wrestling coach
 Victor S. Voinovich Sr., real estate broker

Primary results

Green primary

Candidates

Nominee
 David H. Ellison, architect

Primary results

Independents

Candidates
 Ken Lanci, businessman
 Tim McCormack, former Cuyahoga County commissioner (1997-2004)
 Don Scipione, businessman

General election

Results

References

Cuyahoga County executive
Cuyahoga County executive
2010 executive